The Association of Plaine Valley communes (French: Communauté de communes de la Vallée de la Plaine) is a former administrative association of communes which straddled the Vosges and Meurthe-et-Moselle départements of eastern France in the region of Lorraine. It was created in December 1996. It was merged into the new Communauté d'agglomération de Saint-Dié-des-Vosges in January 2017. The association had its administrative offices at Raon-l'Étape, which contained more than 75% of the grouping's total population.

The name of the commune comes from the River Plaine which crosses the district.

Composition 
The Communauté de communes comprised the following communes:

Meurthe-et-Moselle / 54
Bionville   
Pierre-Percée 
Raon-lès-Leau

Vosges / 88
Allarmont 
Celles-sur-Plaine
Luvigny
Raon-l'Étape
Raon-sur-Plaine
Vexaincourt

References

Vallee de la Plaine
Vallee de la Plaine